Gudrun Anna Therese Zollner (born 21 July 1960) is a German politician from the Christian Social Union in Bavaria who was a member of the German Bundestag from 2013 to 2017.

Political career 
Zollner was elected on the Bavaria State List in the 2013 German federal election.

In the 2021 German federal election, Zollner was number 24 on the Bavaria state list, but was not elected.

References

See also 

 List of members of the 18th Bundestag

Living people
1960 births
Members of the Bundestag for the Christian Social Union in Bavaria
Members of the Bundestag 2013–2017
21st-century German politicians
21st-century German women politicians
Members of the Bundestag for Bavaria
Female members of the Bundestag